Isabelle Thorpe (born 4 March 2001) is a British synchronised swimmer. She competed in the women's duet event at the 2020 Summer Olympics held in Tokyo, Japan. She also represented Great Britain at the 2017 World Aquatics Championships in Budapest, Hungary and at the 2019 World Aquatics Championships in Gwangju, South Korea. She also competed at the 2022 World Aquatics Championships in Budapest, Hungary. She trains at the City of Bristol Swimming Club.

At the 2019 World Aquatics Championships, Thorpe and Kate Shortman competed in the duet technical routine and duet free routine and they finished in 14th place in the preliminary round in both events.

In 2021, she competed in the duet free routine and duet technical routine events at the 2020 European Aquatics Championships held in Budapest, Hungary. Thorpe and Kate Shortman finished in 9th place in the duet technical routine at the 2022 World Aquatics Championships held in Budapest, Hungary.

Isabelle is hoping to further her career in 2024 by attending the Paris 2024 Olympics. Here she hopes to achieve a bronze medal alongside duet partner and lifelong friend Kate Shortman.

References

External links
 
 

2001 births
Living people
British synchronised swimmers
Synchronized swimmers at the 2017 World Aquatics Championships
Artistic swimmers at the 2019 World Aquatics Championships
Artistic swimmers at the 2022 World Aquatics Championships
Synchronized swimmers at the 2020 Summer Olympics
Olympic synchronised swimmers of Great Britain
Place of birth missing (living people)
Sportspeople from Bristol
21st-century British women